Monaco competed at the 2012 Summer Olympics in London from 27 July to 12 August 2012. This was the nation's nineteenth consecutive Olympiad since its debut in 1920.

Comité Olympique Monégasque sent the nation's largest delegation to the Games, since the 1988 Summer Olympics in Seoul. A total of 6 athletes, 5 men and 1 woman, competed. Single sculls rower Mathias Raymond and judoka Yann Siccardi made their second consecutive Olympic appearance. Backstroke swimmer Angelique Trinquier, the youngest and only female athlete of the team, at age 21, was honored as the nation's flag bearer at the opening ceremony. Monaco continued its medal-less streak started after the 1924 Games.

Athletics

Men

Judo

Monaco has had 1 judoka invited.

Rowing

Monaco has received one wild card.

Men

Qualification Legend: FA=Final A (medal); FB=Final B (non-medal); FC=Final C (non-medal); FD=Final D (non-medal); FE=Final E (non-medal); FF=Final F (non-medal); SA/B=Semifinals A/B; SC/D=Semifinals C/D; SE/F=Semifinals E/F; QF=Quarterfinals; R=Repechage

Sailing

Monaco has qualified 1 boat for each of the following events.

Men

M = Medal race; EL = Eliminated – did not advance into the medal race;

Swimming 

Monaco has been given a wild card.

Women

Triathlon

Monaco has been given a wild card.

References

Nations at the 2012 Summer Olympics
2012
2012 in Monégasque sport